Juan Carlos Da Costa (1944—1976) was a Paraguayan writer, politician, activist, and leader of the clandestine Political Military Organization (OPM), created in the mid 1970s against General Alfredo Stroessner's dictatorship. He died fighting the police on 3 April 1976.

Youth and studies 

Da Costa was born in Asunción in 1944, the son of a Bolivian mother and a Paraguayan father, Juan Da Costa, who took her to Asunción to live with him. He studied in the Colegio Nacional de la Capital, from which he was expelled in 1956. During his youth, he had was briefly active in the Liberal Party, and contributed to cultural magazines including Pendulum and Criterion.

He was imprisoned for the first time in August 1967, due to his resistance to the regime of President Alfredo Stroessner, who had taken power of the Republic of Paraguay in 1954 through a coup d'état. Da Costa was tortured in prison, and remained there until 1971 when he was deported to Argentina. Once in Argentina, he continued his attempts to create an organization to lead a revolution in Paraguay.

Exile 

In Argentina, Da Costa established relations with many socialist organizations, mostly Montoneros. In 1973, he travelled to Salvador Allende's Chile and met with leaders of the Unidad Popular and the Revolutionary Left Movement. During those years, he began living with Nidia González Talavera, who would be his companion during the rest of the revolutionary struggle. In 1974 he entered Paraguay in secret, and began contacting and organising the first members of the organization that would become the OPM. The movement defined its political views as "revolutionary nationalism", a euphemism for a Leninist movement, which was willing to use guerrilla warfare to fight the dictatorship.

The OPM 

Da Costa's leadership was fundamental to the growth of the organization in the capital and in certain farmer groups, many of them previously associated with the Ligas Agrarias Cristianas movement. During the next few years, the OPM grew unexpectedly quickly, but was unable to carry out much activity, though in the first few months of 1976 the organization was led by a small number of Paraguayans students who had studied in Corrientes, Argentina.

Death 
In March 1976, OPM student activist Carlos Brañas was caught by border police in Encarnación, surprising the OPM as well as the police. After an investigation, the police learned about the OPM and its members, and the government responded with harsh repressive measures in which every OPM operative discovered led them to the next. On the night of 4 April 1976, the police intercepted Da Costa, Mario Schaerer Prono and his wife, Guillermina Kannonikoff, important leaders of the OPM, at a house in the Herrera neighbourhood of Asunción. The police entered the property and Da Costa died in the ensuing gunfight, after shooting the police commissioner, Alberto Buenaventura Cantero, in the chest. Shaerer Prono and Kannonikoff escaped through the back door of the house and hid in a nearby school where they both used to teach, but were turned in to police by a priest, with the promise that they would not be tortured. Years later, information from the Archives of Terror established that the police had tortured the prisoners nonetheless; Mario Shaerer Prono was tortured to death in the Department of Investigations, and Guillermina gave birth to their son during her imprisonment.

Legacy 

The repression against the OPM continued during the next weeks, leaving 20 people dead and more than 1,500 people in jail, many of whom had no knowledge of the OPM. The events were labelled in the press as the "Painful Easter".

Juan Carlos Da Costa remained largely unknown to the public until the discovery of the Terror Archives in 1992. These previously classified documents detailed the repression and torture perpetrated by the police, as well as information about the many Paraguayan resistance activists who had been killed or imprisoned during this period.

References 

 BOCCIA PAZ, Alfredo, "La década inconclusa. Historia real de la OPM", Editorial El Lector, Asunción, 1997
 BOCCIA PAZ, Alfredo, GONZALEZ, Myriam y PALAU, Rosa. "Es mi informe. Los archivos secretos de la Policía de Stroessner". Centro de Documentación y Estudios, Asunción, 1994.
 CAMPOS, Daniel y BORDA, Dionisio. "Las organizaciones campesinas en la década de los ochenta. Sus respuestas ante la crisis". CIPAE, Asunción, 1992.

External links 
 La profecía autocumplida.
 Organización Política Militar Primero de Marzo

1944 births
1976 deaths
Paraguayan activists
Paraguayan politicians
Paraguayan non-fiction writers
Paraguayan male writers
Deaths by firearm in Paraguay
People shot dead by law enforcement officers
20th-century non-fiction writers
Male non-fiction writers